is a fictional character who appears in the Sword Art Online series of light novels by Reki Kawahara.

In the real world, Suguha is the cousin and adoptive sister of series protagonist Kazuto Kirigaya (also known as "Kirito"); after he becomes trapped in the eponymous Sword Art Online video game in the series' first story arc, she starts playing a similar VR game, Alfheim Online, to better understand the world in which her brother is imprisoned. After her mother reveals to her that Kazuto Kirigaya is not her biological brother, Suguha starts to develop romantic feelings towards him but is later saddened after realizing his attachment to Asuna Yuuki.

In the anime adaptation, Leafa is voiced in Japanese by Ayana Taketatsu and in English by Cassandra Lee Morris. The character has received mostly positive critical reception, with praise centered on her character development and portrayal.

Appearances

In Sword Art Online

Suguha Kirigaya, also known as Sugu, is Kazuto "Kirito" Kirigaya's "sister" in the real world; she is in actuality his cousin, as her mother had been raising her sister's child from a young age, though neither Suguha nor Kirito knew about this until later. She is a diligent worker and has been practicing kendo for 8 years, partially to escape the loneliness and isolation in her life. After Kirito gets trapped in Sword Art Online, she begins playing Alfheim Online as a Sylph in an attempt to try to understand him better, and it is at this time that she finds out they are cousins rather than siblings; with her mother revealing to her that he is not her biological brother, but is actually her cousin and was adopted into their family when he was young. This causes Sugu to develop feelings for him that she doesn't really understand; however, because he is trapped inside SAO, she never acts on them. However, when Kazuto awakens after his two-year ordeal, those feelings return, but she realizes that he is already in love with someone else, namely Asuna.

Coincidentally, she meets Kazuto's avatar, Kirito, in Alfheim Online after he saves her from an attack by player killers. Unaware of his true identity, she decides to help him on his quest to find somebody which eventually leads them to the world tree. After understanding the depth of his love for Asuna, she resolves to give up on him and instead becomes attached to Kirito in ALO. However, when Kirito's true identity is revealed, she is heartbroken and the two of them have an awkward exchange in the real world where Sugu reveals her feelings for him. Not knowing how to respond or comfort her, Kazuto tells her he will be waiting for her in-game. When they meet up they engage in a fight which culminates with both of them letting down their guard expecting the other one to kill them, but that only leads to them hugging and apologizing to each other. Leafa lets go of her feelings for Kirito and after pulling herself together she helps him rescue Asuna from the top of the world tree.

She regularly plays ALO together with Kirito, Asuna, Silica, Klein and the rest of their group. Leafa, Lisbeth and Silica also feature as protagonists in the spin-off manga series Sword Art Online: Girls' Ops, where they form a team with Kirito away on a study program and Asuna tied up in family affairs.

Reception

Critical commentary

Leafa has received generally positive critical reception. Karen Mead of Japanator.com critiqued Suguha's character as "a fairly nuanced, sympathetic portrayal of someone falling in love with a blood relation due to an unfortunate set of circumstances, which is entirely different from the 'I love you, Oni-chan!', fetishism that we see all too often in anime [...] We get to know Suguha entirely too well for that", thus debunking criticism of "Suguha falling for Kirito [being] toxic, awful siscon crap". Noting that the focus shifts away from Asuna towards Leafa in the Fairy Dance arc, Anime News Network's Theron Martin wrote in a review that "Suguha's unrequited love seems more like a play meant to pander to 'Big Brother Complex' fans, though she does get some nice emotional development out of it and some very good scenes later on when the matter of her attempt to replace her misplaced love for Kazuto Kirigaya with Leafa's attraction to Kirito (who is also unknowingly her brother) blows up". Reviewing the spin-off manga Sword Art Online: Girls Ops, Martin praised it for Leafa's prominence in the storyline, and "while Suguha was a veritable co-lead for one story arc, she has now been relegated to that role in the franchise, too".

Rebecca Silverman, also of Anime News Network, referred to Leafa as a "somewhat more interesting character" than Kirito, despite her crush on him being "annoying". She referred to her having "promise as a character" as one of the positive aspects of the third Fairy Dance light novel. Silverman, in a review of episode 15 – 25 in the Sword Art Online anime, went on to say that "Leafa shows more emotional strength as a heroine than Asuna ever did", and she "also stand[s] out as one of the more interesting, developed characters", due to not being overly reliant on Kirito. Silverman also found Kirito and Leafa's relationship to have developed more naturally than Kirito and Asuna's. In his Sword Art Online: Girls' Ops review, Theron Martin also wrote that "given the immense success of the Sword Art Online franchise, it should not be a surprise that it would eventually spawn some manga spin-offs [...] That the first such manga would feature Silica, Lisbeth, and Leafa is also no surprise, as fans have clamored for the former two in particular to get more attention ever since they were first introduced".

Popularity and merchandise

Suguha ranked 6th on a Japanese Charapedia poll of the "anime character they’d want as a little sister" the most, and 2nd counting only the male votes. Another Charapedia survey where 10,000 fans were asked to find the most "charming busty characters" in anime and manga had Leafa placed 3rd with 409 points, though she came 2nd with 370 points for just the male respondents. Asuna, Kirito and Leafa appeared in a campaign by the "Manga Anime Guardians" project in combating anime and manga piracy, with the project being supported by 15 anime production studios and manga publishers. Leafa has also appeared in Sword Art Online-related video games, including crossover title Dengeki Bunko: Fighting Climax. A pre-release promotion by Bandai Namco for video game Sword Art Online: Code Register allows already registered users to be entered into a lottery where the winner receives a Leafa figure.

Sword Art Online girls (including Leafa) feature in a merchandise lottery by Bandai, where they are depicted in french maid clothing with cooking utensils, with Anime News Network humorously noting that they have "brought in a pretty penny for the franchise's creators". She also features as a swimsuit figurine in a 1/7th scale pose, as well as other bikini-clad figures, such as models of her and Asuna under parasols or as a straw holder. Leafa also appears as a painted figure. Sword Art Online glasses based on the characters included a Leafa model described as "perfect for those who like Sylvan girls with strength and beauty". There are also 3D light-up LED models of Kirito, Asuna, Sinon, and Leafa (as Suguha Kirigaya).

See also

List of Sword Art Online characters

References

External links
Characters at the Sword Art Online official Japanese website
Characters at the Sword Art Online official North American website
 Leafa on IMDb

Literary characters introduced in 2009
Female characters in anime and manga
Fictional Japanese people in anime and manga
Fictional kendoka
Female soldier and warrior characters in anime and manga
Teenage characters in anime and manga
Sword Art Online characters